Hunei District is a rural district in Kaohsiung City, Taiwan.

History
After the handover of Taiwan from Japan to the Republic of China in 1945, Hunei was organized as a rural township of Kaohsiung County. On 25 December 2010, Kaohsiung County was merged with Kaohsiung City and Hunei was upgraded to a district of the city.

Administrative divisions
The district consists of Haishan, Liujia, Taiye, Gongguan, Yecuo, Dahu, Tianwei, Hunei, Haipu, Wenxian, Zhongxian, Yixian, Zhongxing and Hutung Village.

Politics
The district is part of Kaohsiung City Constituency II electoral district for Legislative Yuan.

Education
 Tung Fang Design University

Tourist attractions 
 Hankou Canal
 Mausoleum of Lord Ningjing, Ming Dynasty
 Shigeo Fukuda Design Museum
 TSC Mini Train Old Rail Track Reconstruction
 Yuemeichi Ciji Temple (月眉池慈济宫)
 Dahu Night Market
 Wei Zi Nei Night Market

Notable natives
 Lin Yi-chuan, baseball player

See also 
 Kaohsiung

References

External links